The Macedonian Municipal Leagues is the fourth and fifth-highest football competition in the North Macedonia.

Municipal football associations 
There are 25 active municipal football associations or OFS' which act within the Football Federation of Macedonia. In 2019, multiple municipal football associations were disbanded by the Agency of youth and sport in North Macedonia due to their lack of teams.

Promotion to the Third League - North 

 OFS Kisela Voda
 OFS Kumanovo
 OFS Lipkovo (disbanded in 2019)
 OFS Skopje

Promotion to the Third League - Center 
 OFS Kavadarci
 OFS Negotino
 OFS Prilep
 OFS Veles

Promotion to the Third League - Southeast 
 OFS Gevgelija
 OFS Radovish
 OFS Strumica
 OFS Valandovo

Promotion to the Third League - East 
 OFS Kochani
 OFS Kratovo
 OFS Probishtip
 OFS Sveti Nikole
 OFS Shtip
 OFS Vinica

Promotion to the Third League - West 
 OFS Gostivar
 OFS Kichevo
 OFS Tetovo

Promotion to the Third League - Southwest 
 OFS Bitola
 OFS Demir Hisar (disbanded in 2019)
 OFS Makedonski Brod (disbanded in 2019)
 OFS Ohrid
 OFS Resen
 OFS Struga

References

External links
Football Federation of Macedonia 
MacedonianFootball.com 
MakFudbal.com 

 

4
Fourth level football leagues in Europe
Fifth level football leagues in Europe